Mr. Big Stuff is the debut studio album recorded by American singer Jean Knight, released in 1971 on the Stax label.

Chart performance
The album peaked at No. 8 on the R&B albums chart. It also reached No. 60 on the Billboard 200. The album features the title track, which peaked at No. 2 on the Billboard Hot 100 and No. 1 on the Hot Soul Singles chart. The album was remastered and reissued with bonus tracks in 1990 by Fantasy Records.

Track listing

Personnel
Wardell Quezergue – piano, organ
James Stroud – drums, percussion
Jerry Puckett – guitar
Vernie Robbins – bass

Charts

Singles

References

External links
 

1971 debut albums
Jean Knight albums
Stax Records albums